Joseph or Joe Walker may refer to:

People

Musicians
Joe Louis Walker (born 1949), American blues musician from San Francisco
Joe Walker (Zydeco) (born 1944), American Zydeco singer and accordionist from Lafayette, Louisiana

Politicians
Joseph H. Walker (1829–1907), US Representative from Massachusetts, 1893–1899
Joseph Walker (Massachusetts speaker) (1865–1941), his son, Speaker of the Massachusetts House of Representatives
Joseph Marshall Walker (1784–1856), Governor of Louisiana, 1850s
Joseph Knox Walker (1818–1863), American politician and officer in the Confederate Army

Athletes
Joseph W. Walker (born 1952), karate practitioner and instructor
Joe Walker (cricketer) (born 1992), New Zealand cricketer
Joseph Walker (swimmer), Australian swimmer with an intellectual disability
Joe Walker (linebacker) (born 1993), American football linebacker
Joe Walker (defensive back) (born 1977), American football defensive back
Joe Walker (wide receiver), American football wide receiver, see 2019 Chicago Bears season

In arts and entertainment
Joseph A. Walker (playwright) (1935–2003), American playwright
Joseph Walker (cinematographer) (1892–1985), Hollywood director of photography during the 1930s and 1940s
Joe Walker (novelist) (1910–1971), Australian novelist and union organiser
Joe Walker (film editor) (born 1963), British film editor

Other
Joseph A. Walker (1921–1966), American astronaut
Joseph Cooper Walker (1762–1810), Irish antiquary and writer
Joseph Edison Walker (1879–1958), former president of the Universal Life Insurance Company
Joseph R. Walker (1798–1876), early explorer of the American West who established the segment of the California Trail, from Fort Hall, Idaho, to the Truckee River
Joseph Thomas Walker (1908–1952), pioneer in forensic science
Joseph Walker (British Army officer) (1890–1965), British major-general - see List of British generals and brigadiers

Fictional characters
Joe Walker (private detective), a New York private investigator of the Kommissar X book and film series
Private Joe Walker, from the British television sitcom Dad's Army